Félicien Chapuis (29 April 1824 – 30 September 1879) was a Belgian doctor and entomologist. He specialised in Coleoptera and finished the text of Genera des coléoptères by Théodore Lacordaire (1801—1870) when Lacordaire died.
He wrote:
1874. Histoire Naturelle des Insectes. Genera des Coléoptères. Tome 10. Libraire Encyclopédique de Roret, Paris, 455 pp., pls. 111–124. (Phytophages)
1875. Histoire Naturelle des Insectes. Genera des Coléoptères. Tome 11. Libraire Encyclopédique de Roret, Paris, 420 pp., pls. 125–130. (Phytophages)
1876. Histoire Naturelle des Insectes. Genera des Coléoptères. Tome 12. Libraire Encyclopédique de Roret, Paris, 424 pp., pls. 131–134. (Érotyliens. Endomychides, Coccinellides).

Belgian entomologists
Coleopterists
1824 births
1879 deaths